19-Noretiocholanolone, also known as 5β-estran-3α-ol-17-one, is a metabolite of nandrolone (19-nortestosterone) and bolandione (19-norandrostenedione) that is formed by 5α-reductase. It is on the list of substances prohibited by the World Anti-Doping Agency since it is a detectable metabolite of nandrolone, an anabolic-androgenic steroid (AAS).

Traces of 19-noretiocholanolone may be naturally present in human urine. Consumption of boar meat, liver, kidneys and heart have been found to increase urinary 19-noretiocholanolone output.

See also
 Etiocholanolone
 19-Norandrosterone
 5α-Dihydronandrolone
 5α-Dihydronorethisterone

References

5α-Reduced steroid metabolites
Secondary alcohols
Estranes
Human drug metabolites
Ketones
World Anti-Doping Agency prohibited substances